Chase Lyons (December 1866 – death date unknown) was an American Negro league pitcher in the 1900s.

A native of Columbus, Ohio, Lyons played for the Chicago Columbia Giants in 1902.

References

External links
Baseball statistics and player information from Baseball-Reference Black Baseball Stats and Seamheads

1866 births
Date of birth missing
Year of death missing
Place of death missing
Columbia Giants players
Baseball pitchers
Baseball players from Columbus, Ohio